This Time We Mean It is the fifth studio album by REO Speedwagon, released in 1975. It peaked at number 74 on the Billboard 200 chart in 1975, It was the third and last album to feature Mike Murphy on vocals and features the single "Reelin'" written by Murphy.

Track listing

Personnel
REO Speedwagon
Mike Murphy – lead vocals
Gary Richrath – guitar, lead vocals on "Dance"
Neal Doughty – keyboards
Gregg Philbin – bass, backing vocals
Alan Gratzer – drums, backing vocals

Charts

Album

Release history

References

REO Speedwagon albums
1975 albums
Albums produced by Bill Szymczyk
Epic Records albums